Nicole Annette Williams (born September 23, 1977) is an American attorney and politician serving as a Democratic member of the Maryland House of Delegates representing District 22, which represents a portion of Prince George's County, Maryland.

Early life and career
Williams was born on September 23, 1977, in Washington, D.C. She attended the University of Pittsburgh, where she earned a B.A. degree in history and communications in 1999, and the University of Pittsburgh School of Law, where she earned a J.D. degree in 2002. She was admitted into the Maryland Bar in 2002, the District of Columbia Bar in 2005, and the Virginia State Bar in 2015. After graduating, Williams worked as an attorney for several law firms, including Ober, Kaler, Grimes & Shriver, Hileman & Williams, and Rees Broome.

Williams got involved with politics in 2010 when she filed to run for the Maryland House of Delegates in District 23A. In 2012, she successfully ran for Delegate to the Democratic National Convention, representing Barack Obama. In 2014, Williams graduated from a training course hosted by Emerge Maryland, an organization created to prepare potential female Democratic candidates for public office, and successfully ran for the Prince George's County Democratic Central Committee, representing District 22 At Large. In September 2017, she again announced her candidacy for the House of Delegates in District 22. She came in fourth place in a field of five candidates, receiving 13.8 percent of the vote. In December 2018, Williams was elected to be the 3rd Vice Chair of the Maryland Democratic Party.

In October 2019, Delegate Tawanna P. Gaines resigned from the Maryland House of Delegates after being indicted on wire fraud charges. Following speculation, Williams applied to fill the vacancy left by the former Delegate. Her candidacy was endorsed by state Senator Paul G. Pinsky and Delegates Anne Healey and Alonzo T. Washington, and the central committee recommend Williams to Governor Larry Hogan to fill the vacant seat.

Since 2019, Williams has served on the Board of Directors for Emerge Maryland.

In the legislature
After the resignation of Delegate Tawanna P. Gaines, the Prince George's County Democratic Central Committee recommended Williams to the Governor to fill the vacant seat. Governor Hogan appointed Williams on November 15, 2019. Williams was sworn in as a Delegate on December 6, 2019, and assigned to the House Judiciary committee.

In 2020, Williams ran as a delegate to the 2020 Democratic National Convention, representing Elizabeth Warren.

Political positions

Abortion
In January 2022, Williams attended a pro-choice rally at Lawyers Mall in Annapolis, Maryland. During the 2022 legislative session, Williams introduced legislation that would establish that civil or criminal charges can't be pursued against people who experience miscarriages, stillbirths, or from undergoing abortion services.

Elections
Williams introduced legislation in the 2021 legislative session that would allow voters to cast ballots at curbside voting locations.

Social issues
In February 2022, Williams attended a rally to urge lawmakers to pass the Time to Care Act, legislation that would offer paid family leave to all Marylanders.

Transportation
In May 2021, Williams attended a rally alongside a number of elected officials to protest a proposed Maglev train between Baltimore and Washington, D.C. Williams introduced legislation during the 2021 legislative session that would block the use of state funds to construct the maglev.

Redistricting
In July 2021, Williams attended a public hearing hosted by the Maryland Citizens Redistricting Commission to ask commission members to keep the state's current multi-member legislative district system in their proposed map.

Electoral history

References

External links
 
 

Living people
1977 births
Democratic Party members of the Maryland House of Delegates
University of Pittsburgh alumni
Politicians from Washington, D.C.
21st-century American politicians
African-American state legislators in Maryland
African-American women in politics
21st-century American women politicians
21st-century African-American women
21st-century African-American politicians
20th-century African-American people
20th-century African-American women